Emilio Menghini (1903 – 31 October 1980) was an Australian sports shooter. He competed in the 300 m rifle event at the 1948 Summer Olympics in London.

References

External links
 

1903 births
1980 deaths
Australian male sport shooters
Olympic shooters of Australia
Shooters at the 1948 Summer Olympics
Sportsmen from Western Australia
People from Day Dawn
20th-century Australian people